HMS Orpheus was an  which served in the Royal Navy during the First World War. The M class were an improvement on the previous , capable of higher speed. The vessel was launched on 17 June 1916 and joined the Grand Fleet. Orpheus spent much of the war undertaking anti-submarine warfare patrols in the North Sea and escorting convoys across the Atlantic Ocean. In 1917, the destroyer was involved in a friendly fire incident with the British submarine . After the Armistice that marked the end of the First World War, the destroyer joined the Home Fleet. However, this role did not last long and the destroyer was deemed superfluous to requirements. Soon after, Orpheus was placed in reserve, decommissioned and, on 1 November 1921, sold to be broken up.

Design and development
Orpheus was one of twenty-two  destroyers ordered by the British Admiralty in November 1914 as part of the Third War Construction Programme.

Armament consisted of three single  Mk IV QF guns on the ship's centreline, with one on the forecastle, one aft on a raised platform and one between the middle and aft funnels. A single 2-pounder (40 mm) pom-pom anti-aircraft gun was carried, while torpedo armament consisted of two twin mounts for  torpedoes. The ship had a complement of 76 officers and ratings.

Construction and career
Laid down at their shipyard in Sunderland, Orpheus was launched by William Doxford & Sons on 17 June 1916 and completed during September. The destroyer was the sixth Royal Navy ship to be named after Orpheus, the poet in Greek mythology that travelled to the world of Hades in search of Eurydice. The vessel was deployed as part of the Grand Fleet, joining the Thirteenth Destroyer Flotilla at Scapa Flow.

The destroyer was active in anti-submarine warfare but with variable results. On 18 January 1917, Orpheus was one of six destroyers that undertook patrols termed "high speed sweeps" in the North Sea using paravanes. No submarines were sighted. The destroyer did spot a submarine on 19 March while on patrol and attacked with gunfire, the shells narrowly missing the conning tower. However, the victim was the British boat  and the friendly fire incident led to a reassessment of the advice given to submarines. The Admiralty identified that the patrols were not as successful as they needed and so withdrew destroyers like Orpheus to focus on the more effective convoy model. The destroyer was escorting a convoy of five empty oilers returning to Texas when one, SS Oakleaf, was torpedoed by the submarine  on 25 July.

After the armistice, the Grand Fleet was disbanded and Orpheus temporarily joined the Fourth Destroyer Flotilla of the Home Fleet. However, the harsh conditions of wartime service, exacerbated by the fact that the hull was not galvanised and operations often required high speed in high seas, meant that the destroyer was worn out. When the Royal Navy returned to a peacetime level of mobilisation, Orpheus was declared superfluous to operational requirements. The destroyer was initially transferred to Chatham on 15 October 1919 and placed in reserve. However, this position did not last long and Orpheus was decommissioned, sold to Fryer on 1 November 1921 and returned to Sunderland to be broken up.

Pennant numbers

References

Citations

Bibliography

 
 
 
 
 
 
 
 
 
 
 

1916 ships
Admiralty M-class destroyers
Ships built on the River Wear
World War I destroyers of the United Kingdom